The Meizhou–Longchuan high-speed railway is a high-speed railway currently under construction in China.

It is expected to open in 2024.

History
Construction officially began on 30 June 2020.

Stations

References

High-speed railway lines in China
High-speed railway lines under construction